Picardo may refer to:

People
 Robert Picardo (born 1953), American actor and singer
 Fabian Picardo (born 1972), Gibraltarian politician and barrister

Places
 Picardo Farm, in Wedgwood, Seattle, Washington

See also
 Picard (disambiguation)
 Piccard, surname
 Piccardo, surname